Heterixalus alboguttatus is a species of frogs in the family Hyperoliidae endemic to Madagascar.  Its natural habitats are subtropical or tropical moist lowland forests, subtropical or tropical moist shrubland, subtropical or tropical seasonally wet or flooded lowland grassland, swamps, freshwater marshes, intermittent freshwater marshes, arable land, heavily degraded former forests, ponds, irrigated land, and seasonally flooded agricultural land. In the pet trade, it is commonly called the starry night reed frog, because of its patterning.

References

Heterixalus
Endemic frogs of Madagascar
Amphibians described in 1882
Taxa named by George Albert Boulenger
Taxonomy articles created by Polbot